Baird v. State Bar of Arizona, 401 U.S. 1 (1971), was a United States Supreme Court case in which the Court ruled:

In this case, a law school graduate who had passed the Arizona written bar examination had applied to be admitted to the Arizona bar, but had refused to answer a question as to whether she had ever been a member of the Communist party. On that basis, the State Bar of Arizona refused to admit her.

See also 
 State Bar of Arizona

Further reading

External links
 
 
 First Amendment Center

United States Supreme Court cases
Legal history of Arizona
United States freedom of association case law
United States professional responsibility case law
1971 in United States case law
United States Supreme Court cases of the Burger Court